The Los Angeles Prehospital Stroke Screen (abbreviated LAPSS) is a method of identifying potential stroke patients in a pre-hospital setting.

Screening criteria

 No history of seizures or epilepsy
Age 45 years or older
At baseline, patient is not bedridden and does not use a wheelchair
Blood glucose between 60 and 400 mg/dL
Obvious asymmetry-unilateral weakness with any of the following motor exams: 
Facial Smile/Grimace
Grip
Arm Strength

If all of the above criteria are met (or not ascertainable) the LAPSS is positive for stroke. Patients may still be experiencing a stroke even if LAPSS criteria are not met.

Validity
A January 2000 study, conducted by 3 teams of Los Angeles-based paramedic units resulted in "sensitivity of 91% (95% CI, 76% to 98%), specificity of 97% (95% CI, 93% to 99%), positive predictive value of 86% (95% CI, 70% to 95%), and negative predictive value of 98% (95% CI, 95% to 99%). With correction for the 4 documentation errors, positive predictive value increased to 97% (95% CI, 84% to 99%)."

In a Chinese study, Beijing paramedics using the protocol, completed LAPSS screenings in an average of 4.3±3.0 minutes (median, 5 minutes). The study resulted in a sensitivity of 78.44% and a specificity of 90.22%.

See also
 FAST (stroke)
 Cincinnati Prehospital Stroke Scale

References

Stroke
Medical assessment and evaluation instruments
Emergency medical services in the United States